Fire Station No. 4, also known as the Maxwell Place Fire Station, is located at 301 Maxwell Place, Elmira, New York.  It was designed by local architects Pierce & Bickford.  It was built in 1897, and is significant as an example of firehouse design around the start of the 20th century.

Gallery

References

Buildings and structures in Elmira, New York
Fire stations on the National Register of Historic Places in New York (state)
Renaissance Revival architecture in New York (state)
Fire stations completed in 1897
Defunct fire stations in New York (state)
National Register of Historic Places in Chemung County, New York